Events from the year 1784 in Scotland.

Incumbents

Law officers 
 Lord Advocate – Ilay Campbell
 Solicitor General for Scotland – Robert Dundas of Arniston

Judiciary 
 Lord President of the Court of Session – Lord Arniston, the younger
 Lord Justice General – The Viscount Stormont
 Lord Justice Clerk – Lord Barskimming

Events 
 9 February – Royal Highland and Agricultural Society of Scotland founded as the Highland Society of Edinburgh.
 May – the Buchanites are expelled from Irvine, going on to establish a celibate community at New Cample near Closeburn, Dumfriesshire.
 25 & 27 August – apothecary James Tytler makes the first balloon ascents in Great Britain, in a hot air balloon from Edinburgh.
 14 November – Samuel Seabury is consecrated at the house of John Skinner, coadjutor bishop of Aberdeen, as first Bishop of the Episcopal Diocese of Connecticut (his native state), the first bishop of the Episcopal Church in the United States.
 Highland estates whose revenues were forfeited to the government by their proprietors following the Jacobite rising of 1745 are restored to their legal heirs on discharge of debts. The accrued funds are primarily applied to completion of the Forth and Clyde Canal.
 "Wash Act" reduces excise duty on Scotch whisky and provides a definition of the Highland Line.
 St Andrew's Church in New Town, Edinburgh, opened.

Births 
 11 January – Thomas Hamilton, architect (died 1858)
 20 February – Adam Black, publisher (died 1874)
 18 May – William Tennant, poet (died 1848)
 17 July – John Campbell, surgeon (died 1867)
 27 August – William Cargill, first Superintendent of Otago Province (New Zealand) (died 1860 in New Zealand)
 25 September – James Bremner, shipbuilder and salvor (died 1856)
 7 December – Allan Cunningham, poet and artistic biographer (died 1842 in London)

Deaths 
 29 January – George Bogle of Daldowie, tobacco and sugar merchant and Rector of the University of Glasgow (born 1700)
 13 February – William Burnes, farmer, father of Robert Burns (born 1721)
 10 August – Allan Ramsay, portrait painter (born 1713; died at Dover)
 20 May – Alexander Ross, poet (born 1699)

The arts
 22 May – English actress Sarah Siddons makes her Scottish debut in Edinburgh.

References 

 
Years of the 18th century in Scotland
Scotland
1780s in Scotland